Carabus stscheglowi is a species of ground beetle in the subfamily Carabinae. It can be found in European Russia and in Ukraine.

References

stscheglowi
Beetles of Europe
Beetles described in 1827
Taxa named by Carl Gustaf Mannerheim (naturalist)